George Spencer ( 1600 – April 8, 1642) was the second person in history to be executed in Connecticut. He was executed by hanging for charges of sodomy after being wrongfully convicted for an alleged sexual act with an animal, in which it was erroneously claimed that Spencer had fathered a female pig's offspring. His hanging was the first wrongful execution in Connecticut's history.

After a review of the case in 2015, Spencer was given a posthumous pardon by Superior Court Judge John C. Blue, concluding that Spencer's confession was coerced and thus inadmissible, while also stating that Spencer's alleged crime of fathering a piglet was "biologically impossible". Spencer's case was described by Blue as the "first verifiable false confession in American history".

Biography
George Spencer is described as an ugly, balding servant with a glass eye.  He is believed to have lived for a time in Boston and while there was found guilty of receiving stolen goods.  His punishment was a flogging. He then moved to the New Haven Colony, and continued to be a "habitual troublemaker".  He was open about his lack of faith, never praying in the years of being in Connecticut and only reading the Bible when forced to by his master.

Trial and execution 

When a sow gave birth to a malformed, one-eyed piglet it was considered a manifestation of God's proof of Spencer's sins.   Spencer was arrested, and the Puritan authorities deemed the birth a work of God.  They believed that this was irrefutable evidence that an act of bestiality had taken place.  He was charged with "prophane, atheistical carriage, in unfaithfulness and stubbornness to his master, a course of notorious lying, filthiness, scoffing at the ordinances, ways and people of God".

Spencer was told that "he that confesseth and forsaketh his sins shall finde mercie", but it was never made clear to him whether this mercy related to the proceedings of the court or those of God.  Having witnessed a repentant child molester being whipped for his crime Spencer believed that his best option was to confess.  On the realisation that this might lead to a death sentence he retracted his statement.  He repeated this confession and retraction again, trying to find the best solution to his situation.

When the trial began the magistrates knew the necessity of having two witnesses to the crime.  They used Spencer's retracted confessions as one witness and the stillborn piglet as the other, ruling that this was sufficient to determine his guilt.  On April 8, 1642, the sow was put to death by the sword and Spencer was hanged.

Spencer's death was early in the history of Connecticut and is reported to be only the second execution to take place in Connecticut and the first of a non-Native American.

Pardon

On August 28, 2015, in a review of old New Haven criminal cases by Superior Court judge John C. Blue, George Spencer was granted a posthumous pardon for his convictions, with Blue ruling that Spencer's confession was forced and that the alleged crime of fathering a piglet was "biologically impossible". Blue called Spencer's case the "first verifiable false confession in American history".

Similar case 

In 1645, Thomas Hogg, another servant in New Haven, was imprisoned for several months for very similar crimes.  A sow gave birth to two deformed piglets that allegedly resembled Hogg.  However, Hogg never confessed to the crime, and the requirement of finding two witnesses could not be met.

See also 

 Capital punishment in Connecticut
 Crime in Connecticut
 List of people executed in Connecticut
 Wrongful execution

References

1642 deaths
People from Boston
People from New Haven, Connecticut
People executed by Connecticut Colony
17th-century executions of American people
Year of birth uncertain
American people convicted of sodomy
Sex crime trials
Trials in the United States
Zoophilia
Wrongful executions
Overturned convictions in the United States
False confessions